Alexandra Duel-Hallen is a professor of electrical and computer engineering at North Carolina State University known for her research in wireless networks.

Education
Duel-Hallen is a 1982 graduate of Case Western Reserve University, with a double major in mathematics and computer science. She earned a master's degree from the University of Michigan in 1983, and completed her Ph.D. at Cornell University in 1987. Her dissertation, Detection Algorithms for Intersymbol Interference Channels, was supervised by Chris Heegard.

Recognition
Duel-Hallen has been listed as an ISI Highly Cited researcher.
She was elected as an IEEE Fellow in 2011, "for contributions to equalization and wireless communications".

References

Year of birth missing (living people)
Living people
American electrical engineers
American women engineers
Case Western Reserve University alumni
University of Michigan College of Engineering alumni
Cornell University alumni
North Carolina State University faculty
Fellow Members of the IEEE
American women academics
21st-century American women